is a professional wrestling stable, currently performing in the Japanese professional wrestling promotion World Wonder Ring Stardom. The stable currently consists of Syuri, Mirai, Ami Sourei, Konami, Tomoka Inaba and Nanami.

History

Formation. Under Syuri's leadership (2022–present)

After winning the World of Stardom Championship from Utami Hayashishita at Stardom Dream Queendom on December 29, 2021, Syuri felt underrated as being a normal member of Donna Del Mondo. After several months, she showed her dissatisfaction to the leader Giulia and even broke up their "AliKaba" tag team on March 21, 2022, at Stardom in Nagoya, announcing that she wants her own path so she would hire herself a bodyguard. On the first night of the Stardom World Climax from March 26, 2022, after successfully defending the World of Stardom Championship against Giulia, Syuri officially resigned from Donna Del Mondo and revealed her new unit's official name as "God's Eye" and also revealing Ami Sourei as being her bodyguard and implicitly the stable's first member besides her. On the first night of the Stardom Cinderella Tournament 2022 from April 3, Syuri defeated Sourei in a first round tournament match, and after her victory, Mirai came out to announce her resignation from Donna Del Mondo and joining God's Eye. On the second night of the tournament from April 10, Ami Sourei and Mirai teamed up to defeat Oedo Tai's Saki Kashima and Ruaka. On the third night of the Tournament from April 17, Konami reached out via video message, announcing that they will be supporting God's Eye during the Stardom Golden Week Fight Tour. Ami Sourei and Mirai defeated freelancer Momoka Hanazono and Waka Tsukiyama at Stardom New Blood 2 on May 13, 2022. On the third night of the Cinderella Tournament from April 17, Mirai defeated Saki Kashima to advance into the semi-finals. On April 29, she succeeded in winning the 2022 edition of the tournament by defeating Koguma in the finals. On the first night of the Stardom Golden Week Tournament  from May 1, 2022, Syuri, Mirai and Ami Sourei teamed up with a returning Konami to defeat Cosmic Angels (Tam Nakano, Unagi Sayaka, Mina Shirakawa and Waka Tsukiyama) in an eight-woman tag team match. Konami announced that her return is just brief and that she will act as an official member of God's Eye only until the May 7 show. At Stardom Golden Week Fight Tour on May 5, Syuri, Mirai, Ami Sourei and Konami defeated Donna Del Mondo's Giulia, Himeka, Natsupoi and Mai Sakurai. At Stardom Flashing Champions on May 28, 2022, Ami Sourei teamed up with Hina and Rina in a losing effort against Momo Kohgo, Saya Iida and Lady C, Mirai unsuccessfully challenged Saya Kamitani for the Wonder of Stardom Championship, and Syuri successfully defended the World of Stardom Championship against Prominence's Risa Sera. At Stardom Fight in the Top on June 26, 2022, Syuri, Ami Sourei and Mirai unsuccessfully challenged Oedo Tai's title holders Momo Watanabe, Starlight Kid and Saki Kashima, as well as the other group of challengers from Donna Del Mondo, Giulia, Maika and Mai Sakurai in a Three-way six-woman tag team match for the Artist of Stardom Championship. At Stardom New Blood 3 on July 8, 2022, Ami Sourei defeated Nanami, and Mirai went into a time-limit draw against Suzu Suzuki. At Mid Summer Champions in Tokyo, the first event of the Stardom Mid Summer Champions which took place on July 9, 2022, Mirai and Ami Sourei defeated Utami Hayashishita and Miyu Amasaki, and Syuri successfully defended the World of Stardom Championship against Momo Watanabe. At Stardom in Showcase vol.1 on July 23, 2022, Ami Sourei teamed up with Saya Iida unsuccessfully against Maika and Himeka, Mirai competed in a rumble match and made it into the last three, and Syuri defeated Prominence's Hiragi Kurumi in an "I quit" match. At Mid Summer Champions in Tokyo, the first event of the Stardom Mid Summer Champions which took place on July 9, 2022, Mirai and Ami Sourei defeated Utami Hayashishita & Miyu Amasaki, and Syuri successfully defended the World of Stardom Championship against Momo Watanabe. At Mid Summer Champions in Nagoya from July 24, 2022, Ami Sourei and Mirai unsuccessfully challenged Hazuki and Koguma for the Goddess of Stardom Championship, and Syuri successfully defended the World of Stardom Championship against Tam Nakano. At Stardom x Stardom: Nagoya Midsummer Encounter on August 21, 2022, Mirai and Ami Sourei defeated Giulia and Mai Sakurai, and Rina and Ruaka in a three-way match, and Syuri successfully defended the World of Stardom Championship against Nanae Takahashi.  At Stardom New Blood 4 on August 26, 2022, Mirai and Ami Sourei defeated Starlight Kid and Haruka Umesaki when the latter assaulted Mirai with a steel chair in front of the referee. After the match, Oedo Tai attacks God's Eye until Tomoka Inaba came to the ring for the save. Syuri and Inaba then shook hands as Inaba became the newest member of God's Eye. At Stardom in Showcase vol.2 on September 25, 2022, Syuri teamed up with Utami Hayashishita and Lady C as the Rossy Ogawa Bodyguard Army in a losing effort against Grim Reaper Army (Yuu, Nanae Takahashi & Yuna Manase). At Stardom New Blood 5 on October 19, 2022, Mirai, Tomoka Inaba and Nanami unsuccessfully faced Starlight Kid, Ruaka and Haruka Umesaki. Nanami was presented as the unit's new member. In the main event, Ami Sourei defeated Hanan to win the Future of Stardom Championship. At Hiroshima Goddess Festival on November 3, 2022, Konami returned and teamed up with Mirai and Ami Sourei, going into a time-limit draw against Giulia, Thekla and Mai Sakurai. In the main event, Syuri defended the World of Stardom Championship successfully against Maika. At Stardom Gold Rush on November 19, 2022, Ami Sourei, Mirai and Tomoka Inaba fell short to Giulia, Thekla and Mai Sakurai in a "Moneyball tournament", and Syuri successfully defended the World of Stardom Championship against Utami Hayashishita. At Stardom in Showcase vol.3 on November 26, 2022, Mirai teamed up with Utami Hayashishita and Hina in a losing effort against Mayu Iwatani, Hanan and Maika as a result of a "judo rules match". At Stardom Dream Queendom 2 on December 29, 2022, Tomoka Inaba participated in a Stardom rambo, Ami Sourei and Mirai competed in a number one contendership for the Goddess of Stardom Championship won by Maika and Himeka and also involving Ruaka and Natsuko Tora, and Syuri dropped the World of Stardom Championship to Giulia concluding their long term feud.

At Stardom New Blood 7 on January 20, 2023, Ami Sourei and Nanami defeated Momo Kohgo and Momoka Hanazono, and Tomoka Inaba and Mirai defeated Saya Iida and Hanan in the quarterfinals of the inaugural New Blood Tag Team Championship tournament. At Stardom Supreme Fight 2023 on February 4, 2023, Syuri, Konami and Ami Sourei defeated Utami Hayashishita, AZM and Lady C, and Mirai unsuccessfully fought Chihiro Hashimoto.

Independent scene (2022)
Some members of the unit often competed in independent events. At Hana Kimura Memorial Show 2 on May 23, 2022, Syuri defeated Asuka in a singles match.

New Japan Pro Wrestling (2022-present)
Various members of the stable began participating in events promoted by New Japan Pro Wrestling. At Historic X-Over on November 20, 2022, Ami Sourei and Mirai participated in the Stardom Rambo which was won by the latter, and Syuri teamed up with Tom Lawlor in a losing effort against Giulia and Zack Sabre Jr. as a result of a mixed tag team match.

Members

Current

Timeline

Sub-groups

Current
{|class="wikitable sortable" style="text-align:center;"
|-
!Affiliate
!Members
!Tenure 
!Type
|-
|Karate Brave
|SyuriTomoka Inaba
|2022–present
|Tag team
|-
|The New Eras
|Ami SoureiMirai
|2022–present
|Tag team
|-
|Abarenbo GE
|SyuriMiraiAmi Sourei
|2023–present
|Trio

Championships and accomplishments
 Pro Wrestling Illustrated
 Ranked Syuri No. 1 of the top 150 female singles wrestlers in the PWI Women's 150 in 2022
 Ranked Mirai No. 78 of the top 150 female singles wrestlers in the PWI Women's 150 in 2022
Professional Wrestling Just Tap Out
Queen of JTO Championship (1 time, current) – Inaba
World Wonder Ring Stardom
 World of Stardom Championship (1 time) – Syuri
 Future of Stardom Championship (1 time, current) – Sourei
 Stardom Cinderella Tournament (2022) – Mirai
5★Star GP Award (1 time)
5★Star GP Technical Skill Award (2022) – 
 Stardom Year-End Award (2 times)
 Match of the Year 
 Most Valuable Player Award

See also
Neo Stardom Army
Donna Del Mondo
Queen's Quest
Oedo Tai
Stars
Cosmic Angels

References

External links 

 

Independent promotions teams and stables
Japanese promotions teams and stables
Women's wrestling teams and stables
World Wonder Ring Stardom teams and stables